The 2014 Hull City Council election took place on 22 May 2014 to elect members of Hull City Council in England. One third of the council was up for election and Labour retained control of the council.

A total of 46,205 people voted from a registered electorate of 167,336. Turnout was therefore 27.6%

After the election, the composition of the council was
Labour 39
Liberal Democrat 15
Conservative 2
Independent 2
UK Independence 1

Ward results
No elections were held in Beverley, Kings Park and Newland wards.

Avenue

Boothferry

Bransholme East

Bransholme West

Bricknell

Derringham

Drypool

Holderness

Ings

Longhill

Marfleet
Two vacancies to be filled, as a casual vacancy, created by the death of Councillor Sheila Waudby, was also to be filled.

Myton

Newington

Orchard Park & Greenwood

Pickering

Southcoates East

Southcoates West

St Andrews

Sutton

University

References

2014 English local elections
2014
2010s in Kingston upon Hull